Albert Mikhailovich Demchenko (born 27 November 1971) is a Russian luger who competed from 1992 to 2014. He is currently coaching the Russian luge team. His daughter Victoria Demchenko is also a luger.

Career
A seven-time Winter Olympian, he won his first medal at the 2006 Winter Olympics in Turin with a silver in the men's singles event. He competed in his sixth Olympics at the 2010 Winter Olympics, coming fourth. He then competed in his seventh Olympics in Sochi 2014 in his native Russia, winning a further two silver medals.

Demchenko also won eight medals at the FIL European Luge Championships with four golds (Men's singles: 2006, 2010; Mixed team: 2012, 2014), two silvers (Men's singles: 1996, 2008), and two bronzes (Men's doubles: 1996; Mixed team: 2013).

He was overall Luge World Cup champion in men's singles in 2004–05.

In December 2017, he was one of eleven Russian athletes who were banned for life from the Olympics by the International Olympic Committee, after doping offences at the 2014 Winter Olympics. In January 2018, he and Tatyana Ivanova successfully appealed against the lifetime ban as well as decision to strip his medals from Sochi Olympics at the court of arbitration for sport. As a result, both his medals were reinstated.

World Cup podiums

Season titles
 1 titles – (1 singles)

See also
 List of athletes with the most appearances at Olympic Games

References

External links

 

1971 births
Living people
People from Chusovoy
Russian male lugers
Lugers at the 1992 Winter Olympics
Lugers at the 1994 Winter Olympics
Lugers at the 1998 Winter Olympics
Lugers at the 2002 Winter Olympics
Lugers at the 2006 Winter Olympics
Lugers at the 2010 Winter Olympics
Lugers at the 2014 Winter Olympics
Olympic lugers of Russia
Olympic lugers of the Unified Team
Soviet male lugers
Olympic silver medalists for Russia
Olympic medalists in luge
Medalists at the 2006 Winter Olympics
Medalists at the 2014 Winter Olympics
Recipients of the Order of Honour (Russia)
Doping cases in luge
Russian sportspeople in doping cases
Sportspeople from Perm Krai